The Kingdom of Westphalia was a client state of France in present-day Germany, that existed from 1807 to 1813. While formally independent, it was ruled by Napoleon's brother Jérôme Bonaparte. It was named after Westphalia, but this was a misnomer since the kingdom had little territory in common with that area. The region mostly covered territory formerly known as Eastphalia.

Napoleon imposed the first written modern constitution in Germany, a French-style central administration, and agricultural reform. The Kingdom liberated the serfs and gave everyone equal rights and the right to a jury trial. In 1808 the Kingdom passed Germany's first laws granting Jews equal rights, thereby providing a model for reform in the other German states. Westphalia seemed to be progressive in immediately enacting and enforcing the new reforms.

The country was relatively poor but Napoleon demanded heavy taxes and payments and conscripted soldiers. Few of the men who marched into Russia with Napoleon in 1812 returned. The Kingdom was bankrupt by 1812. When Napoleon was retreating in the face of Allied advances in 1813, the Kingdom was overrun by the Allies and (in 1815) most of its territories became Prussian. Most of the reforms, however, remained in place.

Formation

The Kingdom of Westphalia was created by Napoleon in 1807 by merging territories ceded by the Kingdom of Prussia in the Peace of Tilsit, among them the region of the Duchy of Magdeburg west of the Elbe River, the Brunswick-Lüneburg territories of Hanover and Brunswick-Wolfenbüttel, and the Electorate of Hesse. Hesse's capital Cassel (modern spelling Kassel) then fulfilled the same function for Westphalia, and the king kept the court at the palace of Wilhelmshöhe, renamed Napoleonshöhe. The state was a member of the Confederation of the Rhine.

Since it was intended as a Napoleonic "model state", a constitution was promulgated on 15 November and enacted by King Jérôme on 7 December 1807, the day after he had arrived in Cassel, making Westphalia the first monarchy in Germany with a modern-style constitution. The constitution made all male residents citizens with equal rights. Thus serfs were liberated, Jews emancipated, and socage abolished. The Napoleonic code was enacted, doing away with guilds and providing for the right of capitalism. A metric system of weights and measures was introduced.

The organisers used French terms to designate the regional territories within the kingdom: departments received names based on watercourses (Elbe, Saale, Weser, Fulda, Leine, Oker) and mountains (Harz), regardless of their traditional names. These departments were generally composed of territories taken from a number of petty states. Compared to the departments of France itself, the Westphalian departments were relatively small and sparsely populated.

While administrative divisions (departments, districts and cantons) were certainly less unequal than the previous territorial divisions, uniformity does not appear to have been a determining factor in their creation. The desire to break from the past, and not just from the random territorial divisions of the former manorial justices, especially influenced the cantonal distribution. Just as before the conquest, freedom of expression remained curtailed and censorship was instituted. In December 1810 the coastal and northern départements North (capital: Stade) and Lower Elbe (capital: Lunenburg) were ceded to the French Empire.

Jews
Following the French example, Jewish congregations were reorganised and a Consistory supervising them was established. The former Brunswick-Wolfenbüttel merchant and man of letters, Israel Jacobson, became its consistorial president, assisted by a board of officers. Jacobson did his best to exercise a reforming influence upon the various congregations of the country. He opened a house of prayer in Cassel, with a ritual similar to that introduced in Seesen. Napoléon's inglorious décret infâme, again restricting the rights of many French Jews, did not apply in Westphalia.

Russian conquest
A significant burden on the kingdom was the requirement to supply troops and financial support for the Napoleonic wars. Large numbers of Westphalian troops fought in the Russian campaign of 1812; the Westphalian Guards heroically but unsuccessfully charged the Raevski Redoubt during the Battle of Borodino.

In September 1813, Russian troops surrounded Cassel, defeated the French completely, and took the city. By October 1 they had conquered the whole Kingdom, but three days later Jérôme returned with French soldiers and managed to recapture Cassel. The Elector of Hesse-Kassel arrived soon after and the Russians besieged the city again. After France lost the Battle of Leipzig on 19 October 1813, the Russians dissolved the Kingdom and restored the status quo of 1806 except for Rietberg and Stolberg-Wernigerode, which went to Prussia.

Coat of arms

The arms reflect the incorporated territories. The first quarter shows the silver horse of Westphalia; the second the lion of Hesse over the counties of Dietz, Nidda, Ziegenhain and Katzenelnbogen; the third was newly designed for non-specified territories around Magdeburg; and the fourth combined Brunswick, Diepholz, Lüneburg and Lauterburg. Around the shield are the Order of the Crown of Westphalia and the French Grand Aigle of the Légion d'honneur. Above is Napoleon's star. Typical of Napoleonic heraldry are the crossed sceptres.

See also
Duchy of Westphalia
Province of Westphalia

References

External links

KMLA (in English)
Corpus juris of the Kingdom of Westphalia (constitution etc.)

1807 establishments in Europe
1813 disestablishments in Europe
1800s in Germany
1810s in Germany
States of the Confederation of the Rhine
Former states and territories of Saxony-Anhalt
Former states and territories of Lower Saxony
Former states and territories of Hesse
Former states and territories of North Rhine-Westphalia
Client states of the Napoleonic Wars
States and territories established in 1807
States and territories disestablished in 1813
Former monarchies of Europe